Hwang I-hsuan (born 21 September 1988) is a retired Taiwanese tennis player.

Hwang won ten doubles titles on the ITF Circuit in her career. On 11 February 2008, she reached her best singles ranking of world No. 266. On 23 March 2009, she peaked at No. 137 in the WTA doubles rankings.

Playing for Taiwan in Fed Cup, Hwang has a win–loss record of 6–10.

Hwang made her WTA Tour main-draw debut at the 2007 Korea Open, in the doubles event partnering Yoo Mi.

Hwang also played in the doubles events of the 2008 Hobart International partnering Lee Ye-ra, and the 2009 HP Open partnering Chan Chin-wei.

Hwang retired from professional tennis 2015.

ITF finals

Singles (0–6)

Doubles (10–9)

Fed Cup participation

Singles

Doubles

References

External links
 
 
 

1988 births
Living people
Taiwanese female tennis players
Sportspeople from Tainan
21st-century Taiwanese women